Sretno dijete (English: Happy child) is a Croatian documentary film directed by Igor Mirković, and produced by Rajko Grlić, an Ohio University professor of film, in 2003. The film is a nostalgic autobiographical overview of the authors adolescence in SR Croatia in the former Socialist Federal Republic of Yugoslavia during the late 1970s and early 1980s which corresponded with the emergence of the Yugoslav punk rock and new wave scenes, both which the author affiliated to, thus turning this film into a rockumentary. The film features interviews and rare footage of some of the top former Yugoslav rock acts ever such as: Azra, Film and Haustor from the author's hometown Zagreb, Croatia where most of the story takes place; then members of Električni orgazam and Idoli whom the author visits in Belgrade, Serbia; as well as Pankrti and Buldožer from Ljubljana, Slovenia. Beside materials filmed around former Yugoslavia, the film also contains interviews with important former Yugoslav artists who currently live abroad. For example, Darko Rundek is interviewed in Paris, France, Mirko Ilić in New York City in the United States, and there are also scenes shot on locations in the Netherlands, Germany, Hungary and other countries. The film is named after a song by Prljavo kazalište from their first self-titled album.

See also
 Yugonostalgia
 New wave music in Yugoslavia
 SFR Yugoslav pop and rock scene
 Cinema of Croatia

References

External links
 

2003 films
Croatian documentary films
Rockumentaries
Autobiographical documentary films
2003 documentary films